There are 3 national parks in Mauritius. Black River Gorges National Park, established in 1994, is the oldest and by far most visited.

National parks 
 Black River Gorges National Park
 Bras d'Eau National Park
 Islets National Park

See also
 Wildlife of Mauritius

References

External links 
 National Parks and Conservation Service

 
Parks